The 1880 Harvard Crimson football team represented Harvard University in the 1880 college football season. The team finished with a 2–2–2 record.

On November 6, 1880, Harvard defeated Columbia 3–0 before a crowd of about 300 who paid 50 cents to watch the game at the Polo Grounds in New York.

Also at the Polo Grounds one week later, Harvard lost to Princeton with between 3,000 and 4,000 in attendance. Princeton scored two goals and held Harvard to one goal. Princeton also had five touchdowns for safety to two for Harvard. The Sun of New York reported that the game, played under the new 1880 rules of the Intercollegiate Football Association, was football in name only, but "in reality a series of wrestling encounters for possession of a large leather globe."

Schedule

References

Harvard
Harvard Crimson football seasons
Harvard Crimson football